The 2009–10 SM-liiga season was the 35th season of the SM-liiga, the top level of ice hockey in Finland, since the league's formation in 1975. TPS won the Kanada-malja and Ilari Filppula from TPS won the Jari Kurri trophy. In the regular season, JYP finished atop the league, Jori Lehterä led the league in points and assists, and three players – Jukka Hentunen, Jonas Enlund, and Juhamatti Aaltonen – tied for the league lead in goals.

Teams

 Head coaches with asterisk replaced original coaches mid-season.

Regular season

Playoffs

References

External links
 

1
Finnish
Liiga seasons